"Dark Web" is an American comic book crossover storyline written by Zeb Wells with art by Adam Kubert and Ed McGuinness, published in 2022 by Marvel Comics. The story, which serving as a spiritual successor to "Inferno", involves Spider-Man and the X-Men joining forces against Ben Reilly and Madelyne Pryor as the two wronged clones are teaming up as Chasm and Goblin Queen to raise hell across the Marvel Universe.

"Dark Web" is bookended by two one-shots, subtitled Dusk and Dawn, and the story continued in the pages of Zeb Wells' run of Amazing Spider-Man. The storyline tied into various other books like Venom (vol. 5) and limited series including Gold Goblin, Mary Jane & Black Cat, Dark Web: Ms. Marvel and Dark Web: X-Men.

Amazing Spider-Man (vol. 6) #18, Dark Web Finale, Dark Web: Ms. Marvel #2, Dark Web: X-Men #3, Mary Jane & Black Cat #2, and Venom (vol. 5) #15 were dedicated in memory of Carlos Pacheco.

Publication history
In April 2022, Marvel comics posted a teaser "The Dark Web is being spun" that will involve Spider-Man prior to the release of the Free Comic Book Day: Spider-Man/Venom #1. The comic book issue ended with a teaser revealing Ben Reilly is working with Madelyne Pryor. At San Diego Comic-Con in July 2022, teaser art from Ryan Stegman offered a glimpse on the event with the Goblin Queen looming over Spider-Man, Venom, Black Cat, Cyclops, Jean Grey, Magik, Iceman, Firestar, Mary Jane, Chasm and Hallows' Eve, a new member of Spider-Man's rogue's gallery. It is revealed in the Next Big Thing panel to be a Spider-Man/X-Men crossover spearheaded by current Amazing Spider-Man writer Zeb Wells. The two franchises recently crossed paths when the X-Men's former ally Moira MacTaggert kidnapped Mary Jane Watson and used her as a puppet to infiltrate the Hellfire Gala.

Prelude issues were published in November to set up the event letting readers see exactly what Chasm and the Goblin Queen have been busy with. Venom (vol. 5) #13 set the stage to the crossover as Eddie Brock returns from space and finds an unexpected ally in Madelyne Pryor. Amazing Spider-Man (vol. 6) #14 introduced Chasm, Reilly's new persona, and a brand new villain, Hallows' Eve, who was pivotal to the event.

Limited series Gold Goblin, Mary Jane & Black Cat, Dark Web: Ms. Marvel and Dark Web: X-Men tied directly to the Dark Web saga. Gold Goblin, written by Christopher Cantwell with art from Lan Medina, set up a new status quo for Norman Osborn whose sins were cleansed during the Last Remains storyline. Mary Jane & Black Cat, written by Jed MacKay with art from Vincenzo Carratù, forces two of the greatest loves of Peter Parker's life for another team up after being thrown into each other's path; Mary Jane and Black Cat previously joined forces during the Beyond storyline. Dark Web: Ms. Marvel, written by Sabir Pirzada with art from Francesco Mortarino, took Ms. Marvel in Limbo against deadly experiments going haywire; Kamala Khan recently started her internship with Oscorp in Amazing Spider-Man. In Dark Web: X-Men, written by Gerry Duggan with art from Rod Reis, the new X-Men team defended New York City from Limbo.

Plot

Prelude
With Peter Parker in a coma from the U-Foes' attack, his clone brother Ben Reilly took his place as Spider-Man and begin cooperating with the company known as the Beyond Corporation, owned by a corrupted businesswoman Maxine Danger. After learning from Doctor Octopus about the files, Ben and Ashley Kafka learned the truth about Maxine's plan which allows Maxine successfully brainwashed them: transforming Ashley into a ravenous Queen Goblin and erasing Ben's memories from his purpose of responsibility. With Peter recovering from a coma and Janine planning to expose Beyond's corruption with Mary Jane Watson and Black Cat's aid, Maxine sends the Queen Goblin to retrieve the file. However, Peter defeated Queen Goblin while Ben went insane from memory loss as he plans to raid the headquarters and apprehend Maxine Danger. Ben abandons Peter to fight the Beyond's lab creatures and a creature called Creature Z (who was made from the DNA of Lizard and Morbius, the Living Vampire), with Misty Knight, Colleen Wing, Monica Rambeau, and Morbius planning to destroy the tower. As Ben quickly raids the tower, Maxine manipulates him to retrieve his memory causing both Peter and Ben to fight each other allowing her to escape from getting captured. As the building starts to collapse, Ben was left broken before being consumed by the substance leaving Peter in deep shame. With the Beyond Tower collapse, Janine manages to recover Ben who is now mutated from the polymer as a result. Tormented by his lost memories, Ben fled from Janine, taking on the alias of Chasm.

Six months after the incident, Peter Parker's life became more strenuous as a result of his actions that caused the explosion in Pennsylvania for an unknown reason. Parker is now facing his financial problem with the debt collector and his relationship issues become more problematic as a result of Aunt May's distrust and Mary Jane's dismissive, while the Fantastic Four denounced him where Spider-Man mentioned to Human Torch that Mister Fantastic and Invisible Woman claimed that he stole from them. He later works with Norman Osborn at the revived Oscorp to help absolve his issues and resumes his relationship with Black Cat after Mary Jane rejected him. Kamala Khan is shown interning at Oscorp.

Meanwhile, at Krakoa, the Quiet Council decided to resurrect Madelyne Pryor to appease Havok, unaware that she remembers her past life as the Goblin Queen. With Magik overcome her demons and relieved from Limbo's influence, she chooses to depart Limbo from her past life and entrusted Madelyne Pryor to take over Limbo as its new regent allowing Pryor to regain her title as the Goblin Queen. A few months later, Chasm encountered and met the Goblin Queen. Both of them learn that they are clones. They form a developing partnership after humiliating Peter Parker into fighting a demon-possessed mailbox, providing their first step of revenge.

Eddie Brock, who died at that time, manages to escape from the Garden of Time in hopes of finding his son Dylan only to find out that he had arrived at the hellish Limbo. He meets the Goblin Queen as she offers a mutually beneficial alliance.

During Spring, Ben raids the Beyond Corporation safe house to restore his memories and discovers an old military program known as the Purgatory Project that allows him to transport from Earth to Limbo, while Janine Godbe lost her faith in her life because of the world's betrayal caused by her suffering from her abusive father and her lifetime in prison. She chose to stay with Ben and support him for his revenge. In Summer, Ben checks on Peter Parker's apartment and encounters the debt collector who mistook him for Peter Parker due to their resemblance. Chasm enters Limbo and meets the Goblin Queen, impressed with his inner demon. Chasm explains to Pryor that he was summoned from Limbo because of his desire that brought him here similar to Pryor's. Pryor welcomes him as her guest. During Fall, Janine overhears their conversation about their grudges against their DNA donors Jean Grey and Peter Parker, and feels unsure about their plan. Having learned from Janine's insecurities, Pryor granted Janine the power by using S'ym's finger and transforming Janine into Limbo's new lieutenant, Hallows' Eve. During the Winter before Christmas, Ben brutally kidnaps the debt collector and takes him to Limbo, allowing the Goblin Queen to trick the debt collector into eating the fruit from the Tree of Exquisite Liberation and absorbing his soul, revealing his evil side. With the Goblin Queen's promise and her army by his side, Chasm plan on consuming Spider-Man's soul and tricking him into eating the fruit.

Main plot
{| class="wikitable" style="width:100%;"
!Title
!Issue #
!Release date
|-
| colspan="6" style="background:#B7F7E1;" |
|-
|Dark Web (Dusk)
| style="text-align:center;" |1
| style="text-align:center;" |December 7, 2022
|-
| colspan="6" |After a nightmare involving Peter Parker, Ben Reilly is told by Goblin Queen that she needs to focus his pain into energy. At the Coffee Bean on the day when the late Harry Osborn was born, Peter Parker, Liz Allan, Flash Thompson, Carlie Cooper, Mary Jane Watson, Emily Osborn, Aunt May, J. Jonah Jameson, Robbie Robertson, Randy Robertson, and Janice Lincoln are catching up when Peter notices Norman Osborn outside. Peter speaks to Norman who regretted about the use of Harry's clone and Ben Reilly's death. Meanwhile, Chasm and Goblin Queen walk through Limbo as she reveals that she has Venom working for her in exchange for her help finding Dylan Brock. Goblin Queen mentions to Chasm that she planned to target the Krakoan base in New York which she cannot attack the X-Men because of her peace agreement with Krakoa. Cyclops, Jean Grey, Havok, Magik, Iceman, and Firestar are walking through New York during the Christmas season where they are doing some Christmas shopping as they see demonic visions. Back in Limbo, Goblin Queen puts on a musical performance for Chasm, Hallow's Eve, and the demons. As she plays another song on her organ, Peter's spider senses go off as Jean Grey senses something. A lot of demonic attacks occur in New York with a stagecoach and a statue being transformed into demonic creatures as Peter changes into Spider-Man and finds that some of the X-Men are fighting the demonic creatures. Goblin Queen plans to raise Hell as she is annoyed that Venom hasn't responded to her calls to meet Hallow's Eve. At Oscorp, Norman is confronted by Chasm who claims that Peter took his memories. As Osborn starts to initiate the Golden Glider voice key, Chasm attacks him. Upon Chasm being knocked down by the Golden Glider, Norman becomes Gold Goblin. Chasm revealed that he posed as Peter in order to get to the Gold Goblin gear as he uses a remote to cause the Golden Glider to explode. He then proceeds to pulverize Norman as revenge. Goblin Queen confronts Venom to remind him about the arrangement they made. Venom mentions that it was before they knew "he was here" and that they will finally kill him. Goblin Queen mentions to Hallow's Eve that she manipulated Venom to make him more complicit, but fears she went too far. Venom then leaves and states that they are going to eat Spider-Man's brain.<ref>Dark Web #1. Marvel Comics.</ref>
|-
| colspan="6" style="background:#B7F7E1;" |
|-
|Amazing Spider-Man (vol. 6)
| style="text-align:center;" |15
| style="text-align:center;" |December 14, 2022
|-
| colspan="6" |As the demonic attacks occur all over New York City, Venom shows up to save a married couple's baby from a transformed baby carriage before continuing his hunt for Spider-Man. After webbing up the demonic Christmas trees, Spider-Man confronts Chasm who claimed that Gold Goblin "slipped". Spider-Man recognizes Chasm as Ben and as he tries to reason with Ben, Venom attacks. Chasm gathers the Lies of Six Bleeding Ones, the Acrid Tears of Kalack the Cleft Socket, and the Binding Tome of Bala-Kan just as Ms. Marvel arrives. Chasm casts a spell from the Binding Tome of Bala-Kan to trap Ms. Marvel in Limbo and proceeds to cast another spell. As Spider-Man continues his fight against Venom, who questions Eddie's seemingly dumber demeanor, J. Jonah Jameson tells his fellow staff members that Christmas is canceled and that they need to make their story. As Jameson goes to his office, he finds Chasm in it as he claims that "New York's not the only thing going to Hell". Threatening to set the nearby demonic Christmas trees on fire, Spider-Man weakens the Venom symbiote due to the screaming trees and punches Eddie. With Venom defeated and the remaining demonic Christmas trees fleeing, Spider-Man is confronted by Goblin Queen and Hallow's Eve. After cutting off Spider-Man when he was about to claim that he resembles Jean Grey, Goblin Queen revealed that her work needs Eddie Brock's help and that she made Venom unhinged. She also states that their mutual friend is done "completing his chores", with Chasm showing up and asking Spider-Man "Where were we"?
|-
| colspan="6" style="background:#B7F7E1;" |
|-
|Amazing Spider-Man (vol. 6)
| style="text-align:center;" |16
| style="text-align:center;" |December 28, 2022
|-
| colspan="6" |Spider-Man and Chasm fight each other as Spider-Man and Chasm argue over Ben's memories. At the X-Men's tree house, Goblin Queen and Hallow's Eve arrive with Venom. Upon donning a Frankenstein's Monster mask, Hallow's Eve gains his abilities where she uses his super-strength to send Venom off the building so that he can serve as a diversion. Spider-Man and Chasm are still fighting as Spider-Man knocks a sphere that Chasm calls his "humdinger" out of his hand. After knocking Spider-Man down, Chasm picks up the sphere and starts reciting a spell. Chasm reveals that he sent J. Jonah Jameson and Robbie Robertson to Limbo. Noticing that Chasm is tormenting the people he knows there, Spider-Man tells Chasm to take him to Limbo. Chasm summons a tentacled demon who then drags Spider-Man to Limbo. Spider-Man finds himself in his civilian attire as a J. Jonah Jameson-type demon tells him "This is your life....SO GET TO WORK", with the rest of his co-workers being demons as well.
|-
| colspan="6" style="background:#B7F7E1;" |
|-
|Amazing Spider-Man (vol. 6)
| style="text-align:center;" |17
| style="text-align:center;" |January 11, 2023
|-
| colspan="6" | In Limbo, Peter punches a shark-like demon who tried to bite the head off of another demon. Peter then gets to work as the demon calls him Parker Pete-Man. At Limbo's Daily Bugle, Jameson is ordering the demon staff around. When the demons claim that Jameson isn't taking the job seriously, Peter saves him. At the suggestion of the demons, Jameson wants Peter to get him pictures of Spider-Man as Peter quietly vows that Ben will pay for this. As Peter walks down the street, Chasm appears and asks if he had a tough day at the office as Peter begs him to let them all go. Chasm states that all he has to do is eat a specific apple and everyone can go home. In an abandoned building, a demon is held captive and turned into Limbo's version of Scorpion called Gorepion by having an actual scorpion placed in him. Chasm speaks to Goblin Queen stating that he has to make Spider-Man feel at home as Goblin Queen reminds him that her demons are on loan. He calls this group of demons the Insidious Six which consists of Doctor Octoball (a demon version of Doctor Octopus that resembles a floating head with eye-tipped tentacles), Grave Goblin (a demon version of Green Goblin who rides a casket-like glider), Rhiceratops (a skeletal demon version of Rhino), Kraken the Hunter (a kraken version of Kraven the Hunter), Lizzaro (a reptilian demon version of Lizard), and Gorepion. When they face a demon operating as Parker-Man, Goblin Queen leaves Chasm to deal with her guests. Chasm informs the Insidious Six that they have it backwards where they need villains and not heroes. Parker-Man flees as Chasm still claims that they have it backwards. At Jameson's demonic apartment, Parker visits Jameson stating that he might have a way to get them out of Limbo. On the streets, the demon operating as Parker-Man runs into his larger brother who has a plan that can help him. This plan has Parker-Man coming in contact with a sample of a Symbiote. The next day, Jameson and Robbie Robertson inform the demonic staff that some demons have been allowed to go to the real New York City and sends them to go investigate this injustice. Once they are gone, Spider-Man arrives where he gets Jameson and Robertson out of the building. They are then confronted by the Insidious Six. As they attack Spider-Man, he is saved by Parker-Man under his new alias of Rek-Rap.
|-
| colspan="6" style="background:#B7F7E1;" |
|-
|Amazing Spider-Man (vol. 6)
| style="text-align:center;" |18
| style="text-align:center;" |January 25, 2023
|-
| colspan="6" | After the X-Men had called a truce with her, Goblin Queen begins to clean up her home before she can help clean up New York of the demonic invasion. She starts by speaking to Chasm to end his torture on Spider-Man. As Chasm swings off, Hallow's Eve claims to Goblin Queen that they can take care of themselves. Meanwhile, Spider-Man meets Rek-Rap who helps Spider-Man fight the Insidious Six. Goblin Queen instructs Hallow's Eve to see that her forces withdraw from New York. Instead, Hallow's Eve puts on a Frankenstein's Monster mask where she throws Goblin Queen off the castle and claims her scythe. As Spider-Man and Rek-Rap continue their fight with the Insidious Six, J. Jonah Jameson and Robbie Robertson run for the portal while fooling the nearby demons that they are just demons in disguise. As Chasm goes to Limbo's fruit tree, he is confronted by Hallow's Eve wielding Goblin Queen's scythe. Chasm is given the scythe as he is transformed into King Chasm. As the Insidious Six converge on Spider-Man, Rek-Rap, Jameson, and Robertson, King Chasm and Hallow's Eve arrive where they knock back Spider-Man and Rek-Rap. Then King Chasm and Hallow's Eve plan to lead all of Limbo's demons to Earth as some of Limbo's architecture ends up in Central Park. The X-Men and Goblin Queen catch up to Spider-Man, Rek-Rap, Jameson, and Robertson as they begin to work together to thwart King Chasm's plans.
|}

Tie-ins
Dark Web: X-Men

Mary Jane & Black Cat

Dark Web: Ms. Marvel

Gold Goblin

Venom

Finale
As New York City is currently Limbo Annex, King Chasm and Hallow's Eve celebrate their version of Christmas as they plan a parade. Goblin Queen wants to reclaim the Staff of Sorrows from King Chasm as Spider-Man states that Ben wants him. As J. Jonah Jameson and Robbie Robertson are taken back to Earth, Spider-Man, Goblin Queen, Rek-Rap, and the X-Men prepare for battle. On the streets of Limbo Annex, King Chasm and Hallow's Eve walk the streets with the Insidious Six and other demons until the X-Men attack. King Chasm orders the Insidious Six to attack the X-Men. Goblin Queen confronts King Chasm and Hallow's Eve while slaying the demons with them as Bedlam slays a Mysterio-type demon, a Vulture-type demon, a Shocker-type demon, and other demons. As King Chasm gives the order to focus their forces on Goblin Queen, he and Hallow's Eve are confronted by Spider-Man and Rek-Rap. Hallow's Eve puts on a werewolf mask and goes on the attack. Magik creates a portal that sends the Insidious Six back to Limbo. Havok catches up to Goblin Queen and Bedlam as more demons from Limbo appear. As Hallow's Eve switches to her Frankenstein's Monster mask to get more strength in fighting Rek-Rap, Spider-Man fights King Chasm and gets overpowered by him. In the nick of time, Gold Goblin and Ms. Marvel show up as Hallow's Eve states that she can get a meal out of his. As demons swarm over Goblin Queen, she unleashes her full power as the demons stop attacking her. Gold Goblin faces off against King Chasm while Ms. Marvel defeats Hallow's Eve. King Chasm finds that Goblin Queen has turned the demons against him. As Hallow's Eve states that she will not leave King Chasm's side, she is teleported away by him. While King Chasm teleports Bedlam away from the fight, Goblin Queen grabs the Scythe of Sorrow as she works to claim it from King Chasm's hands as Magik helps to defeat King Chasm. With Goblin Queen having the Scythe of Sorrow back in her possession, King Chasm regresses back to Chasm as Cyclops calls for a transport teams so that they can take Chasm into custody. Goblin Queen objects to this stating that Chasm has a wound in his soul and that he will be dealt with in the manner of her choosing. Spider-Man states that he wants Chasm placed in a location where Spider-Man can keep an eye on him. Goblin Queen gets an idea. By the time Spring arrives, Spider-Man visits Chasm stating that he just finished cleaning up Chasm's mess where he hasn't been able to find Hallow's Eve or Rek-Rap. When Spider-Man asks Chasm to give him something to prove that there's still some Ben Reilly in there, a demon guard tells Spider-Man that his time is up. Spider-Man leaves Chasm's cell as Goblin Queen states that the demons have gotten confused on the torture he was to be given while stating that Ben's repentance will be rewarded. As Spider-Man sees himself home, Goblin Queen is visited by Cyclops and Jean Grey as it turns out that the building that came from Limbo has become an embassy to all of its demons in New York as Goblin Queen states that there will be no more hiding for those who have been rejected by humanity.

Issues involved
Prelude issues

Main series

Tie-in issues

 Reception 
According to the review aggregator Comic Book Roundup, Dark Web #1 received a score of 7.9/10 based on 9 reviews, Amazing Spider-Man (vol. 6) #15 received a score of 7.6/10 based on 6 reviews, and Amazing Spider-Man (vol. 6) #16 received a score of 8.2/10 based on 4 reviews. In terms of sales in December 2022, per ICv2, Amazing Spider-Man #15 was #4 in units sold and #6 in dollars invoiced, Dark Web #1 was #5 in units sold and #5 in dollars invoiced, and Amazing Spider-Man #16 was #14 in units sold and #22 in dollars invoiced. Some of the tie-in issues, in the same time period, also made the Top 50 list: Mary Jane & Black Cat #1 was #17 in units sold and #13 in dollars invoiced, Dark Web: X-Men #1 was #21 in units sold and #31 in dollars invoiced and Venom #14 was #46 in units sold.

Amer Sawan, for CBR, highlighted that the Dark Web event showcases a Spider-Man who is more efficient but without morals and responsibility. Sawan wrote that Chasm's actions "revealed just how ruthless Spider-Man is if he didn't have a conscience to hold him back". However, Chasm's actions "have turned him into a monster. [...] What Spider-Man would have to trade for guaranteed proficiency is his humanity. Yes, things would become easier, but it would come at the cost of what makes Spider-Man such a great hero". 

Chase Magnett, for ComicBook.com, commented that the Dark Web event acts as both a Spider-Man crossover and a sequel to the 1980s Inferno event, which was mainly focused on X-Men. Magnett wrote that, "yet from the midst of much continuity and nostalgia emerges a story that thrills readers entirely of its own accord in a brilliant introduction to a sincerely promising event. [...] With years of thrilling character work climaxing in a hellish vision of Christmas on Manhattan and many of the best creators at Marvel Comics involved in what's still to come, Dark Web #1 promises readers the gift of another spectacular crossover this holiday season". Magnett called Adam Kubert's art "the story's secret weapon" and stated that "Frank Martin's colors are perfectly suited to the densely paneled pages".

David Brooke, reviewing Dark Web #1 for AIPT, also highlighted Kubert's art and commented that "it appears he's playing around with layout design as he did in Wolverine this past year". Brooke wrote, "I can't say the story is all that deep or that it probes its characters, but it certainly brings an unmistakably 1990s Marvel vibe. It also does the very '90s thing of bringing characters rarely together into one crossover, which is exciting". Tony Thornley, reviewing Dark Web #1 for Comicon'', wrote that the issue was "a mixed bag" with the "interpersonal drama of Spider-Man’s personal life" great but that the X-Men were "wooden". Thornley called the issue's visuals "fantastic" – "Kubert's figures are incredibly expressive, and even the bad panels look interesting. [...] Martin uses colors that are slightly watercolor-ish, and it creates a surreal unease as things go to hell".

Collected editions

Notes

References